Vladimir Borisovich Belov (26 April 1958 – 14 November 2016) was Soviet/Russian handball player who competed in the 1980 Summer Olympics.

In 1980 he won the silver medal with the Soviet team. He played in all six matches and scored 22 goals.

External links
profile

1958 births
2016 deaths
Soviet male handball players
Russian male handball players
Handball players at the 1980 Summer Olympics
Olympic handball players of the Soviet Union
Olympic silver medalists for the Soviet Union
Olympic medalists in handball
Medalists at the 1980 Summer Olympics
Burials in Troyekurovskoye Cemetery